Orange cup coral (Tubastraea coccinea) belongs to a group of corals known as large-polyp stony corals. This non-reef building coral extends beautiful translucent tentacles at night. Tubastraea coccinea is heterotrophic and does not contain zooxanthellae in its tissues as many tropical corals do, allowing it to grow in complete darkness as long as it can capture enough food.

Habitat
Tubastraea coccinea inhabits shaded vertical surfaces and caverns down to huge depths. Orange-cup-corals are also found in very cold water throughout the world. Orange-cup corals often dominate tropical habitats not occupied by other coral species, such as wrecks and cryptic reef habitats. They also colonize artificial structures, but experiments have demonstrated similar preferences for granite, cement, steel and tile. In Brazil, they are most abundant in the shallow sub-tidal zone at shallow depths between 0m and 3m.

Invasive introduction and range
Although Tubastraea coccinea is listed in the Convention on International Trade in Endangered Species (CITES) website and database, it often competes with other benthic invertebrates for substratum space. This may put native species at risk, particularly sponges and native corals. Local exclusion or extinction of such species may occur, and the removal of the native corals may reduce the production of the entire ecosystem, compromising ecosystem functions.

Tubastraea coccinea is native to the Indo-Pacific region, it has been recorded at Sonadia Island, Cox's Bazar, Bangladesh in 2013, by Marinelife Alliance, research organization.  However, it has been introduced to the Atlantic, Brazilian Exclusive Economic Zone, the Caribbean Sea, the Gulf of Mexico, New Zealand Exclusive Economic Zone, and the West African region and Mediterranean Sea (Malta) as well.

References

External links
 
 

Dendrophylliidae
Animals described in 1829